The Norway men's national floorball team is the national floorball team of Norway, and a member of the International Floorball Federation. Affiliated clubs send their best players to tryout and compete bi-yearly in the Men's World Floorball Championship. Norway Men National Floorball team's biggest success is the bronze medal from the 1st World Championships in 1996, which took place in Sweden. Norway has appeared in every World and European Championships tournament organised by the IFF.

Central board
The current central board consists of a President, Vice-President, and Secretary General.

World Championship 

Source:

2020 Norway Active Roster

References

External links 
 Team Card on International Floorball Federation website

Men's national floorball teams
F
Norwegian floorball teams